, also known as , was a Japanese samurai warrior. served the Saitō clan of Mino province. Later, he become a retainer of Oda Nobunaga.

In 1567, they agreed together to join the forces of Oda Nobunaga.

He took part in the Siege of Inabayama in 1567 and the Battle of Anegawa in 1570.

On 12 May 1571, he died fighting against the Ikkō-ikki at the First Siege of Nagashima while under the command of Shibata Katsuie.

Family and relatives
 Ujiie Yukikuni (father)
 Ujiie Naomasa (son)
 Ujiie Yukihiro (son)
 Ujiie Yukitsugu (son)

Others in Ujiie clan
 Ujiie Mitsuuji
 Ujiie Sadanao

References

Samurai
1510s births
1571 deaths
Year of birth uncertain